Balyakalasakhi may refer to:

 Balyakalasakhi, a Malayalam language Indian novel by Vaikom Muhammad Basheer
 Balyakalasakhi (1967 film), a Malayalam language adaptation of the novel starring Prem Nazir and Sheela
 Balyakalasakhi (2014 film), a Malayalam language adaptation of the novel starring Mammootty and Isha Talwar